Sabinal Independent School District is a public school district based in Sabinal, Texas (USA).

The district has three campuses - Sabinal High (Grades 9-12), Sabinal Junior High (Grades 6-8), and Sabinal Elementary (Grades PK-5).

In 2009, the school district was rated "academically acceptable" by the Texas Education Agency.

References

External links
 

School districts in Uvalde County, Texas